The Silver Condor Award for Best Animated Feature , given by the Argentine Film Critics Association, awards the best animated feature film in Argentina each year. The first award was given in 2001.

 
Argentine Film Critics Association